Chaunoides is an extinct genus of screamer. Only one species of this genus is known, namely Chaunoides antiquus.

References 

Anhimidae
Miocene birds
Prehistoric bird genera
Fossil taxa described in 1999